Yaṯiʿe was a queen of the Nomadic Arab tribes of Qedar who ruled in the 8th century BC, circa 730 BC. 

Yatie sent her forces, headed by her brother Basqanu ( Bâsqânu), to aid Merodach-Baladan in his bid to hold on to Babylon. Merodach-Baladan, the leader of the Chaldeans, was also supported by an army from Elam and together these faced the Assyrian forces of Sennacherib on his first campaign in 703 BC. 

The events of the battle are recorded in the annals of Sennacherib which mention Yatie, "queen of the Arabs", and the capture of her brother Baasqanu in the battle. Israel Eph'al writes that this is the first mention in Assyrian documents of Arabs as an ethnic element in Babylonia. Yatie's predecessor was Samsi and she was succeeded by queen Te'el-hunu.

References

Bibliography

Arab queens
Midian
Ancient queens regnant
8th-century BC women rulers
8th-century BC Arabs
Year of birth missing
Year of death missing
Ancient Near Eastern women